The rufous-breasted sabrewing (Campylopterus hyperythrus) is a species of hummingbird in the "emeralds", tribe Trochilini of subfamily Trochilinae. It is found in Brazil, Guyana, and Venezuela.

Taxonomy and systematics

The rufous-breasted sabrewing is monotypic. However, at one time some authors treated what is now the buff-breasted sabrewing (C. duidae) as a subspecies. The two are closely related and may be sister species.

Description

Males and females are almost identical. They have a rather thick bill that is mostly black with a pinkish or light brown base to the mandible. Their face is cinnamon rufous with a dusky "mask" and a white spot behind the eye. Their upperparts are shining coppery green to bronzy green. Their underparts are cinnamon rufous. The central two pairs of tail feathers are reddish to golden bronze and the outer three pairs cinnamon rufous.

Distribution and habitat

The rufous-breasted sabrewing is found on the isolated table mountains called tepuis where northwestern Brazil, western Guyana, and eastern Venezuela meet. It inhabits humid montane forest, especially its edges, disturbed areas, and adjacent scrubby areas.

Behavior

Movement

The rufous-breasted sabrewing is considered to be a year-round resident, but because its abundance fluctuates it is suspected to make seasonal movements.

Feeding

The rufous-breasted sabrewing's foraging strategy and diet are known only sketchily. It does forage for nectar at all levels of the habitat. At times it defends feeding territories, but up to 20 have been seen feeding in a single flowering tree. It is assumed to also feed on small arthropods like nearly all other hummingbirds.

Breeding

Almost nothing is known about the rufous-breasted sabrewing's breeding phenology.

Vocalization

The rufous-breasted sabrewing's song may be as simple as "a series of chip notes." While foraging it makes "a weak, nasal sqeeek with [a] strained quality."

Status

The IUCN has assessed the rufous-breasted sabrewing as being of Least Concern. It has a restricted range and its population size is not known, though the latter is believed to be stable. Habitat changes due to a warming climate are believed to be the only significant threat. It is considered to be fairly common.

References

rufous-breasted sabrewing
Birds of the Tepuis
rufous-breasted sabrewing
Taxonomy articles created by Polbot